Mental Images is an album by trombonist Robin Eubanks which was recorded in 1994 and released on the JMT label.

Reception

AllMusic gave the album 3 stars. The Rough Guide to Jazz called it a "gutsy album, which embraces M-Base and other styles".

Track listing
All compositions by Robin Eubanks
 "Matatape" - 8:29
 "Mental Images" - 8:54
 "Union 2 - Brotherly Love" - 3:50
 "Collage" - 7:07
 "Skin 'n' Bones" - 9:14
 "For What Might Have Been" - 4:07
 "X-Base" - 7:31
 "Egoli (Formerly Johannesburg)" - 6:08
 "CP-Time" - 3:04

Personnel
Robin Eubanks - electric and acoustic trombone, vocals, cowbell, sampler
Randy Brecker - trumpet (tracks 2 & 7)
Antonio Hart - alto saxophone, tenor saxophone (tracks 1, 2, 4, 7)
Kevin Eubanks - acoustic guitar, cowbell, synthbass, (tracks 1-3, 6 & 7) 
Michael Cain - piano, synthesizer (tracks 1, 2, 4) 
Kenny Davis - electric bass (tracks 1 & 7)
Dave Holland - acoustic bass (tracks 2, 4 & 8)
Gene Jackson (tracks 1, 2, 4), Marvin "Smitty" Smith (tracks 5 & 7) - drums 
Kimati Dinizulu - African percussion, berimbau (tracks 1, 4 & 8) 
Adrian von Ripka, Carlos Albrecht, Stefan Winter - vocals (track 1)

References 

1994 albums
Robin Eubanks albums
JMT Records albums
Winter & Winter Records albums